Oja-Beyt also known as جاءبِيت is a town in Chalus County, Iran. It is located at latitude 36° 29' 28" N and longitude 51° 08' 36" E. It lies at an altitude of 1372 metres in the Alborz mountains, 50 km to the north of Tehran, and 25 km south of the Caspian Sea.

The population is 476, and it is near the Alam-Kuh mountain and Sardab River.

References

Populated places in Chalus County